GBLA or variation, may refer to:

People
 Abass Gbla, cricket player representing Sierra Leone at 2010 ICC World Cricket League Africa Region Division Two
 Khadija Gbla, human rights activist from Sierra Leone
 Osman Gbla, Chairman of the African Union's African Peer Review Mechanism for Sierra Leone, and alumni of Ansarul Islamic Boys Secondary School

Groups and organizations
 The Great Bitter Lake Association, the association of ships' crews of the Yellow Fleet
 Gilgit-Baltistan Legislative Assembly, unicameral legislature for Gilgit-Baltistan, Pakistan

Other uses
 Gelora Bandung Lautan Api Stadium, Gedebage, Bandung, West Java, Indonesia; a soccer stadium

See also

 
 Gramm–Leach–Bliley Act (GLBA; Financial Services Modernization Act of 1999) U.S. federal law
 Gabla (disambiguation)